Madiun is a landlocked city in the western part of East Java, Indonesia, known for its agricultural center. It was formerly (until 2010) the capital of the Madiun Regency, but is now administratively separated from the regency. Madiun is commonly known as "Kota Gadis", which is an acronym for "Trading, Education and Industrial City" in Indonesian.

It is surrounded by a number of mountains, including Mount Wilis to the east, to the south the Kapur Selatan range and to the west Mount Lawu.

Administrative districts
The city is divided into three districts (kecamatan), tabulated below with their areas and population totals from the 2010 Census and the official estimates for mid 2019. The table also includes the number of administrative villages (rural desa and urban kelurahan) in each district, and its postal codes.

History

Madiun was the site of a noted uprising in 1948 by elements of the Communist Party of Indonesia (PKI), the "Madiun Affair". After the signing of the Renville Agreement that year, guerrilla units and militias under the influence of PKI were ordered to disband. In Madiun a group of PKI militia refused to disarm and were killed in September. The killings sparked a violent uprising. Army sources claimed that the PKI had announced the proclamation of the "Soviet Republic of Indonesia" on 18 September with Muso as its president and Amir Sjarifuddin as its prime minister.

The uprising was suppressed by republican troops. On 30 September, Madiun was taken over by republican troops of the Silwangi Division. Thousands of party cadres were killed and 36,000 were imprisoned. Amongst the executed PKi members were several leaders including Muso killed on 31 October, allegedly while trying to escape from prison. Other PKI leaders such as D.N. Aidit went into exile in China.

Climate
Madiun has a tropical monsoon climate (Am) with moderate to little rainfall from June to October and heavy rainfall from November to May.

See also
ATV Madiun
Madiun Affair
Indonesian National Revolution

References

External links
 Official site
 Map of Madiun and surrounding area

 
Populated places in East Java